Clarinda is a former unincorporated community in southern Alberta, Canada within the County of Warner No. 5. It is located south of Highway 501, southeast of the Town of Milk River, and east of the Village of Coutts.

An early postmaster gave the community the middle name of her mother, T. Clarinda Clark.

Education

Clarinda School District No. 2459 was formed June 10, 1911 at township 8 - 1 - 13 - W4.

See also 
 List of communities in Alberta

References 

Ghost towns in Alberta
Localities in the County of Warner No. 5